Geoffrey Bodenhausen (born 1951) is a French chemist specializing in nuclear magnetic resonance, being highly cited in his field. He is a Corresponding member of the Royal Netherlands Academy of Arts and Sciences and a Fellow of the American Physical Society.
He is professeur émérite at the Department of Chemistry at the École Normale Supérieure (ENS) in Paris and professeur honoraire at the Laboratory of Biomolecular Magnetic Resonance of the École Polytechnique Fédérale de Lausanne (EPFL). He is a member of the editorial board of the journal Progress in Nuclear Magnetic Resonance Spectroscopy. He is the chair of the editorial board of the journal Magnetic Resonance.

Education
He received a Diploma in chemistry from ETH Zurich in 1974, and a D.Phil. from Oxford University in 1977, supervised by Ray Freeman.

Career 
Bodenhausen began his post-doctoral research under the supervision of Robert and Regitze Vold at the University of California in San Diego. He subsequently worked with Leo Neuringer and Robert G. Griffin at the Massachusetts Institute of Technology and then in 1980 he moved to the ETH in Zurich, where he joined the group of Richard R. Ernst.

In 1985 he was appointed to a professorship at the University of Lausanne. In 1994 he became a professor at the Florida State University in Tallahassee 
filling the position of Director of the Institute for Advanced Studies in Magnetic Resonance. In 1996 he was elected fellow of the American Physical Society "for his numerous contributions toward making magnetic resonance one of the most sophisticated and versatile methods available for gaining insight into structure and dynamics of molecules in condensed and gas phase."

In 1996 he was awarded a professorship at the Ecole Normale Supérieure in Paris. He also held a part-time position at the École Polytechnique Fédérale de Lausanne.

From 2005 to 2011 he chaired the Board of Trustees of EUROMAR.

Research 
Bodenhausen was one of the pioneers in the field of two-dimensional Fourier transform NMR spectroscopy. In the group of Ray Freeman he contributed to some of the first heteronuclear experiments.

In 1976 he proposed a scheme to induce selective excitation of small portions of multiline spectra, later named DANTE by Morris and Freeman.

In 1977 Bodenhausen and Freeman showed how it was possible by observing spectrum of a heteronucleus (an atomic nucleus other than a proton) to achieve indirect detection of the proton resonance frequencies, and the correlations of chemical shifts between protons and heteronuclei. In 1980 Bodenhausen and D. J. Ruben introduced the HSQC (Heteronuclear Single Quantum Coherence) experiment, which produces two-dimensional (2D) spectra with one axis for protons (1H) and the other for a heteronucleus, usually 13C or 15N. This double INEPT has been the base for many subsequent heteronuclear single quantum experiments published in the literature and it has proven pivotal in the spectroscopy organic chemistry and in the field of protein NMR.

One of the first steps in increasing the information content of NMR spectra was the introduction of a relayed homonuclear coherence transfer by Geoffrey Bodenhausen together with Gerhard Eich.

In 1984 he published with Herbert Kogler and Richard R. Ernst a pivotal article in Journal of Magnetic Resonance where they described how to design phase cycles allowing the selection of specific coherence-transfer pathways in NMR pulse experiment.

In 1987 he published with Richard R. Ernst and Alexander Wokaun Principles of Nuclear Magnetic Resonance in One and Two Dimensions, considered a classical monograph on the topic of multidimensional NMR.

Honours and awards 
 1990: National Latsis Prize awarded by the Latsis Foundation.
1993: PhD degree  (Doctor honoris causa), University of Stockholm.
 1997: Corresponding member (Correspondent) of the Royal Netherlands Academy of Arts and Sciences.
 2006: Catalan-Sabatier Prize of the Spanish Royal Society of Chemistry
 2008: Fellow of the International Society for Magnetic Resonance.
 2017: Chevalier de la Légion d'honneur (Knight of the French Legion of Honour)
 2019: Günther Laukien Prize

Books

Patents

References

External links 

1951 births
Living people
Academic staff of the École Polytechnique Fédérale de Lausanne
20th-century French chemists
21st-century French chemists
French expatriates in Switzerland
Members of the Royal Netherlands Academy of Arts and Sciences
Alumni of the University of Oxford
Fellows of the American Physical Society